Frenetic random activity periods (FRAPs), also colloquially known as zoomies, scrumbling, or midnight crazies, are random bursts of energy occurring in dogs and cats in which they run frenetically, commonly in circles. They usually last a few minutes or less. It is not known what causes animals to engage in FRAPs.

Although little data exists regarding the safety of FRAPs, ethologist Marc Bekoff has suggested that dogs should be allowed to freely engage in them as long as the dog is in a safe area and will not harm others or themselves. Likewise, FRAPs are normal and healthy behavior for cats as well. They are referred to as "cat zoomies". They are totally normal behavior for cats, especially in younger cats or kittens. Such quick bursts of energy allow cats to get out any built-up energy, keep themselves fit and practice their hunting skills.

References

Dog training and behavior